Vlado Bozinovski (born 30 March 1964) is an Australian retired footballer who played as a defensive midfielder.

Club career
Bozinovski immigrated to Australia in his teens, going on to play football in the country for South Melbourne FC and Footscray JUST. In 1989, aged 25, and following a very brief spell in Belgium, he moved to Portugal and joined S.C. Beira-Mar, appearing in 32 league games as the Aveiro club retained its top division status.

Staying in the country, Bozinovski signed for giants Sporting Clube de Portugal but, after one single season, returned to his previous club and, in the following year, signed for Ipswich Town in the Premier League. He appeared in only one fourth of the games for the Blues, who only narrowly avoided relegation.

In the 1993 summer, Bozinovski returned to Portugal, representing F.C. Paços de Ferreira and F.C. Felgueiras, playing two out of three seasons in the top flight. He signed for S.League club Tiong Bahru United in May 1999. He left for Turkey the same year where he competed in the 1996–97 Süper Lig with Ankaragücü. The 33-year-old then returned to Singapore, where he played for Tanjong Pagar United FC, Home United FC and Clementi Khalsa FC, the latter as a player-coach until he was relieved of his coaching duties in September 2001.  He retired at the end of the 2001 season.

Subsequently, Bozinovski became a players agent.

International career
Bozinovski gained six caps for Australia, scoring once in the process. His debut took place on 13 June 1988, in a 1–0 friendly win with the United States in Orlando, Florida.

Additionally, Bozinovski represented the nation at the 1988 Summer Olympics in Seoul, appearing twice as a substitute in an eventual quarterfinal exit.

References

External links

Club Brugge archives 

1964 births
Living people
Macedonian emigrants to Australia
Australian people of Macedonian descent
Yugoslav emigrants to Australia
Australian soccer players
Association football midfielders
National Soccer League (Australia) players
Footscray JUST players
South Melbourne FC players
Belgian Pro League players
Club Brugge KV players
Primeira Liga players
S.C. Beira-Mar players
Sporting CP footballers
F.C. Paços de Ferreira players
F.C. Felgueiras players
Premier League players
Ipswich Town F.C. players
Süper Lig players
MKE Ankaragücü footballers
Australia international soccer players
Olympic soccer players of Australia
Footballers at the 1988 Summer Olympics
Australian expatriate soccer players
Australian expatriate sportspeople in England
Expatriate footballers in Belgium
Expatriate footballers in Portugal
Expatriate footballers in England
Expatriate footballers in Turkey
Expatriate footballers in Singapore
Australian expatriate sportspeople in Portugal
Singapore Premier League players
Singapore Premier League head coaches
Tanjong Pagar United FC players
Home United FC players
Australian soccer coaches
People from Ohrid
Soccer players from Melbourne